How To Kill is the first EP by the Canadian rock band Die Mannequin, released on September 25, 2006. Produced by electronic music group MSTRKRFT, How To Kill was the group's first release and because Care Failure had yet to put together a full-time band she performed the vocals, guitar and bass herself with the drums being handled by Jesse F. Keeler of MSTRKRFT and Death from Above 1979 fame.

Track listing
All songs written by Care Failure, except "Fatherpunk" by Care Failure and Michael T. Fox.

"Autumn Cannibalist" – 3:23
"Near The End" – 2:47
"Fatherpunk" – 3:13
"Donut Kill Self" – 4:31

Personnel
Die Mannequin
Care Failure – lead vocals, guitar, bass
Jesse F. Keeler – drums, percussion

Technical staff and artwork
Recorded & Produced by MSTRKRFT.
Art by Care Failure / Marc P.

See also
Die Mannequin

External links
Official website
Myspace

2006 EPs